Pitty Scheer (7 December 1925 – 17 March 1997) was a Luxembourgian cyclist. He competed in the individual and team road race events at the 1948 Summer Olympics.

References

External links
 

1925 births
1997 deaths
Luxembourgian male cyclists
Olympic cyclists of Luxembourg
Cyclists at the 1948 Summer Olympics
Place of birth missing